Local elections took place in Las Piñas on May 9, 2022, within the Philippine general election. The voters elected for the elective local posts in the city: the mayor, vice mayor, one representative, and the councilors, six of them in the two districts of the city.

Background 
Incumbent Mayor Imelda Aguilar would seek for her third and final term. She is running against her opponents which are Antonio Abellar Jr., Luis "Louie" Casimiro, Aladin De Jesus, Ferdinand "Doc Ferds" Eusebio, former Councilor Benjamin Gonzales, former city police chief (Ret.) PSSupt. Simnar Gran, Michael Maestrado, and Emerito "Rey" Rivera.

Incumbent Vice Mayor April Aguilar-Nery would seek for her second term. She is challenging Edilberto "Ed" Angeles, Jerry Delos Reyes, and Antonio Luna.

Incumbent Rep. Camille Villar, was seeking for her second term. She is facing Felipe Garduque II, and Atty. Luisito "Louie" Redoble.

Candidates

Administration coalition

Other coalitions

Candidates not in tickets

Independents 
See the full lists for mayor, vice mayor, representative and councilors.

Results

For Mayor 
Mayor Imelda Aguilar won.

For Vice Mayor 
Vice Mayor April Aguilar-Nery won.

For Representative, Lone District 
Rep. Camille Villar won.

For Councilor

First District 

|-bgcolor=black
|colspan=5|

Second District 

|-bgcolor=black
|colspan=5|

References 

2022 Philippine local elections
Elections in Las Piñas
May 2022 events in the Philippines
2022 elections in Metro Manila